Arthur Gilbert (January 1, 1879 – July 1, 1932) was a Canadian politician, farmer and merchant in Quebec, Canada. Gilbert was elected to the House of Commons of Canada as a Nationalist in a 1910 by-election.

Election victory
Gilbert's surprise victory in what had been a safe Liberal riding, occurred as a result of his opposition to the Laurier government's Naval Service Act. The Act was seen by Quebec nationalists, such as Henri Bourassa, as a sign of Laurier's support for British imperialism and, in particular, that Canada would send troops to support Britain in a future European war.

Gilbert's by-election victory in Drummond—Arthabaska, a riding once held by Laurier himself, was interpreted as a sign that the once solid support for Laurier's Liberals in Quebec was eroding, a trend that would contribute to Laurier's defeat at the hands of Robert Borden's Conservatives in the 1911 federal election. Gilbert's victory also indicated a growing nationalist mood in Quebec, which would later erupt in the Conscription Crisis of 1917.

Gilbert's political career was short-lived, however. He sat in parliament for less than a year before losing his seat in the 1911 election to Liberal Joseph Ovide Brouillard.

References

External links
 

1879 births
1932 deaths
Nationalist MPs
Members of the House of Commons of Canada from Quebec